Positive Thinking Magazine was launched in 2005 as a secular subsidiary of Guideposts.

Its title was based on the book The Power of Positive Thinking by Norman Vincent Peale. Its editorial offices were in New York City.

The magazine ceased publication.

References

Lifestyle magazines published in the United States
Defunct magazines published in the United States
Magazines established in 2005
Magazines with year of disestablishment missing
Magazines about spirituality
Magazines published in New York City